This article details the Wrestling at the 2012 Summer Olympics qualifying phase.

The Wrestling competition at the 2012 Games included 344 athletes. Each competing nation was allowed to enter a maximum of 18 competitors (1 per event).

3 places were reserved for Great Britain as host nation, but Great Britain decided to use only one of them and a further 3 invitational places were decided by the Tripartite Commission. The remaining 338 places were allocated through the qualification process, in which athletes won quota places for their respective nation.

Timeline

Qualification summary

Men's freestyle events

55 kg

60 kg

66 kg

74 kg

84 kg

96 kg

120 kg

Men's Greco-Roman events

55 kg

60 kg

66 kg

74 kg

84 kg

96 kg

120 kg

Women's freestyle events

48 kg

55 kg

63 kg

72 kg

Notes

References
General
 Qualified Wrestlers’ List for the 2012 London Olympic Games

Specific

External links
International Federation of Associated Wrestling Styles

Qualification for the 2012 Summer Olympics
2012